Ark Ecological NGO (also known as Ark Armenia) is a non-governmental organization founded in 2013 working for sustainable development, especially through projects of ecotourism, permaculture and fitness in Syunik Province, Armenia. The organization has its headquarters in Kapan and has built three ecocamps in the Syunik Province (Kapan, Arajadzor and Tandzaver) to host volunteers, tourists, and develop its projects related to permaculture, fitness and hiking.

References

Environmental organizations based in Armenia
Syunik Province